Robert Ellis (born November 6, 1988) is an American singer-songwriter and multi-instrumentalist based in Fort Worth, Texas, United States, who blends country, pop music and jazz.

History 
Robert Ellis was born on November 6, 1988 in Lake Jackson, Texas, United States. He began performing as "Eyes Like Lions" early in 2005, playing in his hometown of Lake Jackson, Texas. 
The self-released LP The Great Rearranger was sold at shows, but Ellis found a higher level of success when American Songwriter magazine named his second album, Photographs, one of the top 50 albums of 2011. Robert Ellis is a New West Records recording artist. Ellis has toured with Alabama Shakes, Old Crow Medicine Show and the Old 97's. Originally from Texas, in 2012, Ellis relocated from Austin, Texas to Nashville, Tennessee to work on his third album, The Lights from the Chemical Plant, in Eric Masse's Casino recording studio under the direction of album producer Jacquire King. Ellis has said that this album, influenced by his hometown, Lake Jackson, Texas, incorporates more pop influences.

Discography
 The Great Re Arranger (2009, self-released)
 Photographs (2011)
 The Lights from the Chemical Plant (2014)
 Robert Ellis (2016)
 Texas Piano Man (2019)

References

External links
 Official website
 Ellis On Mountain Stage

1988 births
Country musicians from Texas
21st-century American singers
Living people
American country singer-songwriters
American male singer-songwriters
Singer-songwriters from Texas
Musicians from Houston
People from Lake Jackson, Texas
21st-century American male singers